SKBC FC, full name Samoa Korean Baptist Church Football Club, is an American Samoan football club.

Honors
FFAS Senior League: 1
2013.

FFAS President's Cup: 1
2013.

Current squad

References

Football clubs in American Samoa